Hairspray: Soundtrack to the Motion Picture is the soundtrack album for the 2007 New Line Cinema musical film Hairspray. The film is an adaptation of the 2002 Broadway musical of the same name, itself adapted from John Waters's original 1988 film. It features performances from the film's cast, which includes John Travolta, Michelle Pfeiffer, Christopher Walken, Amanda Bynes, James Marsden, Queen Latifah, Brittany Snow, Zac Efron, Elijah Kelley, and Nikki Blonsky as the lead character of Tracy Turnblad.

The album has sold upwards of 1,200,000 copies in the USA, and has been certified Platinum by the RIAA.

Critical reception 

The soundtrack received positive reviews from critics.

Album information 
The soundtrack contains nineteen songs from the film written by Marc Shaiman and Scott Wittman, three of which were not included in the stage musical version. Shaiman, who produced the original cast album for the Broadway musical, produced the songs for the film musical as well. Hairspray's music is written and performed to conform to the story's 1962 setting, with influences spanning the genres of rock and roll, soul, and pop.

"Ladies' Choice", a new song performed by Zac Efron, was the Hairspray soundtrack's first single. iTunes released the single on May 15, 2007. The iTunes version of the album includes bonus features such as the bonus track "I Can Wait" (a song written for the film but cut), the "Ladies' Choice" music video, an instructional dance video for "Ladies' Choice", and a digital version of the album booklet. The soundtrack debuted on the Billboard 200 at number 20 and peaked at number two.

"The New Girl in Town", "Big, Blonde and Beautiful (Reprise)", and "Come So Far (Got So Far to Go)" are the three songs new to this version of Hairspray, although "The New Girl in Town" was originally written for but dropped from the Broadway production. "Come So Far (Got So Far to Go)" is played over the film's end credits, as are renditions of two songs from the stage musical which were not included in the film proper: "Cooties" and "Mama, I'm a Big Girl Now". "Cooties" is performed on the soundtrack in a contemporary pop style by singer Aimee Allen. It was also played (without vocals) while the contestants, for Miss Teenage Hairspray, danced to show off their "moves".  "Mama, I'm a Big Girl Now", is performed by each of the three women most famous portraying Hairspray's main character, Tracy Turnblad: the 1988 film's Ricki Lake, the Broadway production's Marissa Jaret Winokur, and this film's Nikki Blonsky. Harvey Fierstein, who played Edna in the original Broadway production, also has a vocal cameo at the end of this track.

Several of the songs from the Broadway musical had their lyrics altered and/or verses removed for use in the film version. These songs include "(The Legend of) Miss Baltimore Crabs", "Welcome to the 60s", "Big, Blonde and Beautiful", "Without Love", "(It's) Hairspray", "You Can't Stop the Beat", et cetera.

In 2016, a vinyl edition of the album was released and sold at numerous retailers to coincide with the release of Hairspray Live!.

Track listing

2-disc Collector's edition
A limited edition two-disc version of the Hairspray soundtrack was released on November 20, 2007, the same day as the film's DVD/Blu-ray release. The 2-disc Collector's edition soundtrack includes the one-disc soundtrack, as well as a second disc featuring additional songs from the film, deleted songs (among them "I Can Wait"), demo recordings, and karaoke versions of certain songs. The album debuted at number 90 on the Billboard 200 with sales of at least 20,000 copies sold.

Additional songs 
Although included in the movie, "The Nicest Kids in Town (Reprise)" (performed by James Marsden and the Council Members) and "Tied Up in the Knots of Sin" (performed by composer Marc Shaiman and director Adam Shankman) were not included on the motion picture soundtrack.

Vocalists

Main vocalists 
 Nikki Blonsky as Tracy Turnblad (also additional voices on 4, 9)
 James Marsden as Corny Collins
 Zac Efron as Link Larkin (also additional voices on 4)
 Michelle Pfeiffer as Velma Von Tussle
 Brittany Snow as Amber Von Tussle (also additional voices on 4)
 John Travolta as Edna Turnblad
 Elijah Kelley as Seaweed J. Stubbs
 Queen Latifah as Motormouth Maybelle
 Christopher Walken as Wilbur Turnblad
 Amanda Bynes as Penny Pingleton (also additional voices on 4)
 Hayley Podschun as Tammy (also additional voices on 4)
 Sarah Jayne Jensen as Shelley

Cameo vocalists 
 Jerry Stiller as Mr. Pinky
 Taylor Parks as Little Inez (also additional voices on 4)
 Harvey Fierstein

The Dynamites 
 Shayna Steele
 Kamilah Marshall
 Terita R. Redd

Background vocals 
Bobbi Page - vocal ensemble, also vocal contractor 
John West - vocal ensemble, also vocal contractor 
Don Taylor - choir director
New Dimensions - gospel choir vocals 
L.A. Mass Choir - gospel choir vocals

Vocal ensemble members: Marc Shaiman, Shoshana Bean, Terron Brooks, Jenn Gambatese, Chester Gregory, Leslie Kritzer, Arnold McCuller, Louis Price, Sabrina Sloan, Donna Vivino, Willis White, Lucien Piane, Chyla Anderson, Jonathan Byram, Keith Cotton, Michael Cunio, Carmel Echols, Cliff Frazier, Christopher Johnson, Katharine Leonard, Laura Lively, Michael Mayo, Sophia Pizzulo, Jamison Scott Robinson, Jessica Rotter, Candice Rumph Burrows, Peter Mathew Smith, Leonard Sullivan, Matt Sullivan, Clarke Thorell, Davia Walker, Ayana Williams, Frank Wolf

Instrumentalists

Featured Rhythm Musicians 
Marc Shaiman – keyboards 
Peter Calo – guitar
Francisco Centeno – bass
Keith Cotton – keyboards 
James “Jim” Cox – keyboards 
George Doering – guitar
Nathan East – bass 
Mike Fisher – guitar
Clint de Ganon – drums, percussion
Rick Gratton – drums
Paul Jackson Jr. – guitar
Dean Parks – guitar 
John Robinson – drums
Larry Saltzman – guitar
Steve Schaeffer – percussion 
David Spinozza – guitar
Neil Stubenhaus – bass
Michael Thompson – guitar 
Michael Valerio – bass

Featured Horn Section 
Saxophones: Dan Higgins (Main), Larry Williams, Joel Peskin & Bill Liston 
Trumpets: Jerry Hey (Main), Wayne Bergeron, Gary Grant, Larry Hall & Warren Luening
Trombones: Charlie Loper (Main), Steve Holtman, Alex Iles & Bill Reichenbach

Hollywood Studio Symphony 
Violins: Ralph Morrison, Julie Ann Gigante & 26 others
Viola: Pamela Goldsmith & 11 others
Cello: Antony Cooke & 10 others
Double Bass: Nico Abondolo & 8 others
Bassoon (1st): Rose Corrigan
Additional Bassoon: Allen M. Savedoff
Clarinets: James Kanter & 4 others
Flute (1st): Louise Dillon
Additional Flutes: Geraldine Rotella & Greg Huckins
Oboe (1st): Thomas Boyd
Additional Oboe: Phillip Ayling
Percussion: Alan Estes & 9 others
Additional Trumpets: Daniel Fornero & Jon Lewis
Additional Trombones: Andrew Martin & Craig Gosnell
Additional Horns: James Thatcher

Chart performance and awards 

Wins
 Billboard Year End Charts (2007)
 Number 1 Top Independent Album of the Year - "Hairspray"

Nominations
 2008 Grammy Awards
 Best Compilation Soundtrack Album for Motion Picture, Television or Other Visual Media

Certifications

See also 
Hairspray (2007 film)
Hairspray: Original Motion Picture Soundtrack
Hairspray: Original Broadway Cast Recording

References

External links 
 
  for the film
 

Musical film soundtracks
2007 soundtrack albums
Albums produced by Lucian Piane